Biar Bandh is a village in Sheosagar block of Rohtas district in Bihar state, India. As of 2011, its population was 987, in 212 families.

Agriculture
Biar Bandh has an agricultural credit society. It has 127.4 hectares of farmland, in addition to 1.3 hectares of permanent pasturage. Most of the land (103.4 hectares) was irrigated in 2011, mostly by canal.

Amenities
As of 2011, Biar Bandh possessed a single primary school. It had no medical facilities or post office. Biar Bandh had both landline and cell phone coverage, but no internet access. Villagers had access to electricity, but not tap water; drinking water instead was provided by hand pump. It had no permanent pucca roads; rather, it had impermanent kutcha roads.

References 

Villages in Rohtas district